Adam is a 1983 American made-for-television film starring Daniel J. Travanti and JoBeth Williams.   It aired on October 10, 1983, on NBC. On its original air date, it was seen by an audience of 38 million people. It was rebroadcast on April 30, 1984, and it was rebroadcast again on April 29, 1985. At the end of each broadcast of the film, a series of missing children's photographs and descriptions were displayed on the screen for viewers, and a telephone number was also given for viewers to call if they had any information about them. The 1985 photograph series was introduced by President Ronald Reagan in a pre-recorded message, "...maybe your eyes can help bring them home." A sequel, Adam: His Song Continues followed on September 29, 1986, also starring Travanti and Williams.

The first part of the film portrays the story of the kidnapping and murder of Adam Walsh on July 27, 1981, along with the effects of this event on the marriage of John and Revé Walsh. The second part of the movie focuses on the Walsh's attempts to pass national child protection laws in the wake of Adam's murder, and the formation of awareness groups surrounding child disappearances. The film was written by Allan Leicht and directed by Michael Tuchner.

Production
Filming of the movie was conducted both in and around Houston, Texas. The scenes portrayed at the Hollywood Mall of Hollywood, Florida, were filmed at the now-defunct Westwood Mall in Houston, at the Sears which was one of its former anchor stores. The mall closed in 1998 and was converted to offices. The Sears store where some scenes were filmed closed in 2017 and was converted to an automobile dealership service center.

The three broadcasts of Adam were followed by pictures and descriptions of missing children as of each of the respective broadcasts. A hotline was also active, to take calls regarding the children. This was ultimately credited with finding 13 of 55 children from the 1983 broadcast, including future rapper Bizzy Bone, and 19 of 51 children shown in the 1984 broadcast. As of two days after the 1985 showing, 3,522 calls had been made to the hotline, and 5 of 54 featured missing children had already been found.

Cast
 Daniel J. Travanti as John Walsh
 JoBeth Williams as Revé Walsh
 Martha Scott as Gram Jean Walsh
 Richard Masur as Jay Howell
 Paul Regina as Joe Walsh
 Mason Adams as Ray Mellette
 Tony Frank as Lt. Richard Hynds
 John M. Jackson as Det. Jim Gibbons
 Alex Harvey as Det. Jack Hoffman

Awards
1984 Primetime Emmy Award nominations:
 Outstanding Drama/Comedy Special (Alan Landsburg, Joan Barnett, executive producers; Linda Otto, producer)
 Outstanding Lead Actor in a Limited Series or a Special (Daniel J. Travanti)
 Outstanding Lead Actress in a Limited Series or a Special (JoBeth Williams)
 Outstanding Writing in a Limited Series or a Special (Allan Leicht)

References

External links
 
 

Films directed by Michael Tuchner
1983 television films
1983 films
American films based on actual events
Films set in Florida
Drama films based on actual events
1983 drama films
Films shot in Houston
NBC network original films
Crime films based on actual events
Films about child abduction in the United States
Alan Landsburg Productions films
Films set in 1981